Dr. Xie Pieqi (1920–October 10, 2003) was the 4th member of the lineage of Yin Style Baguazhang (YSB), and the last person to know the entire system. He was succeeded in the art by his student, He Jinbao.

History 
Xie was born in Beijing, China, to a family of water sellers.

Xie learned Baguazhang from Men Baozhen, who was a student of Yin Fu. Xie started learning martial arts from Men at the age of 13 and would spend nearly 30 years with him. The student to whom Xie had taught the entire Yin Style Baguazhang system, Liu Fang, died unexpectedly in 1985. It was too late to train anyone in the entire system, but He Jinbao became Xie's successor.

Ensuring the Continuance of Yin Style Baguazhang 

Towards the end of his life, Xie worked with He Jinbao to document the entire Yin Style Baguazhang system in a series of instructional DVDs, in an effort to ensure the survival of the system.  In addition, He Jinbao wrote a series of articles to help continue Yin Style Baguazhang. Although Xie knew no one individual could learn the entire system after Liu Fang died, he wanted to preserve it, so that parts of it would endure with many people worldwide. He eventually left the teaching of the martial arts aspect of Yin Style Baguazhang to He Jinbao, and taught the medicine and bodywork of the system himself.

References

Web resources 
 UK London Study Group
 Sweden Stockholm Study Group
 Germany Münster Study Group
 USA Vermont Study Group
 USA Northampton, MA, Study Group
 USA Ann Arbor, MI, Study Group
 USA Bellingham, WA, Study Group
 USA Knoxville, TN (Smoky Mountain) Study Group
 USA Irving, TX

Chinese baguazhang practitioners
1920 births
2003 deaths